The year 1957 in film involved some significant events. The Bridge on the River Kwai topped the year's box office in North America, France, and Germany, and won seven Academy Awards, including Best Picture.

Top-grossing films (U.S.)

The top ten 1957 released films by box office gross in North America are as follows:

Top-grossing films by country
The highest-grossing 1957 films in various countries.

Events
 February 1 – RKO ceases domestic distribution of feature films which is taken over by Universal Pictures.
 May – Ingmar Bergman's The Seventh Seal wins the Special Jury Prize at the 1957 Cannes Film Festival.
 June 6 – Jerry Lewis appears in his first film without Dean Martin in The Delicate Delinquent.
 June – United Artists rejoins the Motion Picture Association of America, following an expansion of the MPAA code appeals board members. The board had previously denied The Man With the Golden Arm a Production Code seal in 1955, leading UA to quit the MPAA.
 October 2 – Raintree County is the first film shot in MGM Camera 65.
 October 16 – First London Film Festival held at the newly opened National Film Theatre.
 December 6 – Ingmar Bergman's Wild Strawberries is released in Sweden.  It goes on to win the Golden Bear at the 8th Berlin International Film Festival and the Golden Globe Award for Best Foreign Language Film in 1959.

Awards

Top ten money making stars

1957 film releases
February 14 - Cinderella (re-release)
July 3 - Bambi (re-release)

Notable films released in 1957
United States unless stated

#
3:10 to Yuma, directed by Delmer Daves, starring Glenn Ford and Van Heflin
8 × 8: A Chess Sonata in 8 Movements, directed by Jean Cocteau
10th of May (Der 10. Mai) – (Switzerland)
12 Angry Men, directed by Sidney Lumet, starring Henry Fonda, Lee J. Cobb, Jack Warden, Jack Klugman, Martin Balsam, E.G. Marshall
1918 – (Finland)
20 Million Miles to Earth, starring William Hopper, with special effects by Ray Harryhausen

A
Aasha, starring Kishore Kumar, Vyjayanthimala and Asha Parekh – (India)
The Abominable Snowman, starring Peter Cushing and Forrest Tucker – (GB)
Across the Bridge, starring Rod Steiger – (GB)
The Admirable Crichton, starring Kenneth More and Diane Cilento – (GB)
An Affair to Remember, starring Cary Grant and Deborah Kerr
All Mine to Give, starring Glynis Johns and Cameron Mitchell
And Quiet Flows the Don (Tikhiy Don) – (U.S.S.R.)
April Love, starring Shirley Jones and Pat Boone
The Auntie from Chicago (I theia ap' to Chicago) – (Greece)

B
Baby Face Nelson, starring Mickey Rooney
Back Again, directed by Ezz El-Dine Zulficar, written by Yusuf Sibai, starring Shoukry Sarhan, Mariam Fakhr Eddine and Salah Zulfikar – (Egypt)
The Bachelor Party, directed by Delbert Mann, written by Paddy Chayefsky, starring Don Murray
Band of Angels
Barnacle Bill, starring Alec Guinness – (GB)
The Barretts of Wimpole Street, starring John Gielgud and Jennifer Jones – (GB)
Beau James, a biopic starring Bob Hope, Vera Miles, Alexis Smith
La Bestia humana (The Human Beast) – (Argentina)
The Big Land, starring Alan Ladd and Virginia Mayo
Bitter Victory, directed by Nicholas Ray, starring Richard Burton – (France/US)
The Black Scorpion, starring Mara Corday, with special effects by Willis O'Brien
Blue Murder at St Trinian's, starring Terry-Thomas and Joyce Grenfell – (GB)
Bombers B-52, starring Natalie Wood, Karl Malden, Marsha Hunt
Boy on a Dolphin, starring Alan Ladd, Clifton Webb, Sophia Loren
The Bridge on the River Kwai, directed by David Lean, starring William Holden, Alec Guinness, Jack Hawkins, Sessue Hayakawa – winner of 7 Oscars, 3 BAFTAS and 3 Golden Globes – (GB)
Brothers in Law, starring Richard Attenborough and Ian Carmichael – (GB)
The Brothers Rico, starring Richard Conte
The Burglar, starring Dan Duryea and Jayne Mansfield (filmed in 1955 but released in 1957 due to sudden popularity of Mansfield)

C
The Careless Years, starring Dean Stockwell, Natalie Trundy, Barbara Billingsley
City of Gold – (Canada)
Confessions of Felix Krull (Bekenntnisse des Hochstaplers Felix Krull) – (West Germany)
Country Hotel (Rong Raem Narok) – (Thailand)
The Cranes Are Flying (Letyat zhuravli), directed by Mikhail Kalatozov – winner of the Palme d'Or – (U.S.S.R.)
Crime of Passion, starring Barbara Stanwyck, Sterling Hayden, Raymond Burr
The Crucible (Les Sorcières de Salem), starring Simone Signoret and Yves Montand – (France/East Germany)
The Curse of Frankenstein, starring Peter Cushing and Christopher Lee – (GB)

D
The D.I., directed by and starring Jack Webb
Decision at Sundown, starring Randolph Scott
The Delicate Delinquent, starring Jerry Lewis (his first film without Dean Martin) and Darren McGavin
The Delinquents, directed by Robert Altman
Designing Woman, starring Gregory Peck and Lauren Bacall
Desk Set, starring Spencer Tracy, Katharine Hepburn, Gig Young
The Devil's Hairpin, starring Cornel Wilde
Do Aankhen Barah Haath (Two Eyes, Twelve Hands) – (India)
Don Quixote (Don Kikhot) – (U.S.S.R.)
Don't Go Near the Water, starring Glenn Ford, Gia Scala, Anne Francis
Drango, starring Jeff Chandler
Duped Till Doomsday (Betrogen bis zum jüngsten Tag) – (East Germany)

E
Early Morning Chill (五更寒), directed by Yan Jizhou – (China)
Edge of the City, directed by Martin Ritt, starring John Cassavetes, Sidney Poitier, Ruby Dee
The Enemy Below, produced and directed by Dick Powell, and starring Robert Mitchum, Curd Jürgens, Theodore Bikel, David Hedison

F
A Face in the Crowd, directed by Elia Kazan, written by Budd Schulberg, starring Andy Griffith, Patricia Neal, Walter Matthau
Les Fanatiques (The Fanatics), starring Pierre Fresnay and Michel Auclair – (France)
A Farewell to Arms, starring Rock Hudson and Jennifer Jones
A Farewell to the Woman Called My Sister (Wakare no chatsumi-uta shimai-hen) – (Japan)
Fathers and Sons (Padri e figli), directed by Mario Monicelli, starring Vittorio De Sica – (Italy)
Fear Strikes Out, starring Anthony Perkins and Karl Malden
Fire Down Below, starring Rita Hayworth and Robert Mitchum
The Flute and the Arrow (En Djungelsaga), directed by Arne Sucksdorff – (Sweden)
Forty Guns, directed by Samuel Fuller, starring Barbara Stanwyck, Barry Sullivan, Gene Barry
Funny Face, directed by Stanley Donen, starring Audrey Hepburn, Fred Astaire, Kay Thompson

G
The Garment Jungle, starring Lee J. Cobb and Gia Scala
The Gates of Paris (Porte des Lilas), directed by René Clair – (France/Italy)
Gateway of India, starring Madhubala – (India)
The Girl in Black Stockings, starring Lex Barker, Anne Bancroft, Mamie Van Doren
The Girl in the Kremlin, starring Lex Barker and Zsa Zsa Gabor
The Girl Most Likely, starring Jane Powell and Cliff Robertson
Les Girls, aka Cole Porter's Les Girls, starring Gene Kelly, Kay Kendall, Taina Elg, Mitzi Gaynor
La grande strada azzurra (The Wide Blue Road) – (Italy)
Gun for a Coward, starring Fred MacMurray
Gunfight at the O.K. Corral, directed by John Sturges, starring Burt Lancaster, Kirk Douglas, Rhonda Fleming

H
The Halliday Brand, starring Joseph Cotten and Viveca Lindfors
A Hatful of Rain, directed by Fred Zinnemann, starring Eva Marie Saint, Don Murray, Anthony Franciosa
He Who Must Die (Celui qui doit mourir), directed by Jules Dassin – (France)
Heaven Knows, Mr. Allison, directed by John Huston, starring Deborah Kerr and Robert Mitchum
The Helen Morgan Story, starring Paul Newman and Ann Blyth
Hell Drivers, directed by Cy Endfield, starring Stanley Baker, Peggy Cummins, Patrick McGoohan – (GB)
Hour of Decision, starring Jeff Morrow and Hazel Court – (GB)
The House of the Angel (La Casa del ángel) – (Argentina)

I
I Am Waiting (Ore wa matteru ze) – (Japan)
The Incredible Shrinking Man, directed by Jack Arnold, starring Grant Williams
Interlude, directed by Douglas Sirk, starring June Allyson
Island in the Sun, starring Dorothy Dandridge, James Mason, Joan Fontaine, Joan Collins, Harry Belafonte
Istanbul, starring Errol Flynn

J
Jailhouse Rock, starring Elvis Presley
Jamboree, featuring Dick Clark, Frankie Avalon, Fats Domino
Jeanne Eagels, starring Kim Novak
Jet Pilot, starring John Wayne and Janet Leigh
Joe Butterfly, starring Audie Murphy and Burgess Meredith
Johnny Tremain, starring Hal Stalmaster and Sebastian Cabot
The Joker Is Wild, starring Frank Sinatra, Jeanne Crain, Eddie Albert, Mitzi Gaynor

K
Kabuliwala (aka The Man) – (India)
Kathputli (Puppet), directed by Amiya Chakravarty and Nitin Bose, starring Vyjayanthimala and Balraj Sahni – (India)
A King in New York, directed by and starring Charles Chaplin – (GB)
Kiss Them for Me, directed by Stanley Donen, starring Cary Grant, Jayne Mansfield, Suzy Parker

L
The Land Unknown, starring Jock Mahoney
Legend of the Lost, directed by Henry Hathaway, starring John Wayne, Sophia Loren, Rossano Brazzi, Kurt Kasznar
Let's Be Happy, starring Vera-Ellen and Tony Martin – (GB)
The Little Hut, starring Ava Gardner – (GB/US)
Love in the Afternoon, directed by Billy Wilder, co-written by Wilder with I. A. L. Diamond, starring Gary Cooper, Audrey Hepburn, Maurice Chevalier
Loving You, starring Elvis Presley, Lizabeth Scott, Wendell Corey
The Lower Depths (Donzoko), directed by Akira Kurosawa, starring Toshiro Mifune – (Japan)

M
Man of a Thousand Faces, biopic of Lon Chaney, starring James Cagney, Dorothy Malone, Roger Smith, Robert Evans (as Irving Thalberg)
A Matter of Dignity (To teleftaio psema), directed by Michael Cacoyannis – (Greece)
Mayabazar (Fantasy Bazaar), starring N. T. Rama Rao – (India)
Mayerling, a TV film starring Audrey Hepburn
Men in War, directed by Anthony Mann, starring Robert Ryan and Aldo Ray
Miracles of Thursday (Los jueves, milagro), directed by Luis García Berlanga, starring Richard Basehart – (Spain)
Mister Cory, directed by Blake Edwards, starring Tony Curtis, Martha Hyer, Kathryn Grant
The Monolith Monsters, starring Grant Williams and Lola Albright
The Monster That Challenged the World, starring Tim Holt
Mother India, starring Nargis – (India)
My Gun Is Quick, starring Robert Bray (as Mike Hammer)
The Mysterians (Chikyū Bōeigun), directed by Ishirō Honda – (Japan)

N
N.Y., N.Y., a documentary film by Francis Thompson
The Naked Truth, starring Terry-Thomas and Peter Sellers – (GB)
Naya Daur (New Era), directed by B. R. Chopra, starring Dilip Kumar and Vyjayanthimala – (India)
Night of the Demon, (Curse of the Demon), directed by Jacques Tourneur, starring Dana Andrews – (GB)
Night Passage, starring James Stewart
Nightfall, starring Aldo Ray, Brian Keith, Anne Bancroft
Nights of Cabiria (Le Notti di Cabiria), directed by Federico Fellini – (Italy)
Nine Lives (Ni Liv) – (Norway)

O
Oh, Men! Oh, Women!, starring Ginger Rogers and David Niven
The Oklahoman, starring Joel McCrea and Barbara Hale
Old Yeller, Walt Disney film, starring Dorothy McGuire, Fess Parker, Tommy Kirk, Kevin Corcoran
Omar Khayyam, starring Cornel Wilde, John Derek, Debra Paget, Yma Sumac
The One That Got Away, starring Hardy Krüger – (GB)
Operation Mad Ball, starring Jack Lemmon and Ernie Kovacs
An Osaka Story (Osaka Monogatari) – (Japan)
The Outcry (Il Grido), directed by Michelangelo Antonioni, starring Steve Cochran and Alida Valli – (Italy)

P
The Pajama Game, starring Doris Day
Pal Joey, directed by George Sidney, starring Frank Sinatra, Rita Hayworth, Kim Novak
Paths of Glory, directed by Stanley Kubrick, starring Kirk Douglas, Ralph Meeker, Adolphe Menjou
Paying Guest, starring Dev Anand – (India)
Perri, a Disney animated film
Peyton Place, based on novel by Grace Metalious, starring Lana Turner, Hope Lange, Diane Varsi
The Pied Piper of Hamelin, starring Van Johnson and Claude Rains
The Pride and the Passion, starring Cary Grant, Frank Sinatra, Sophia Loren
The Prince and the Showgirl, starring Marilyn Monroe and Laurence Olivier (who also directed)
Public Pigeon No. 1, starring Red Skelton
Pyaasa (Thirsty), directed by and starring Guru Dutt – (India)

Q
Quatermass 2, starring Brian Donlevy – (GB)

R
Raintree County, directed by Edward Dmytryk, starring Montgomery Clift, Elizabeth Taylor, Eva Marie Saint
The Real End of the Great War (Prawdziwy koniec wielkiej wojny) – (Poland)
Rock All Night, directed by Roger Corman, starring Abby Dalton
Rose Bernd, starring Maria Schell and Raf Vallone – (West Germany)
Run of the Arrow, starring Rod Steiger

S
The Sad Sack, starring Jerry Lewis and Peter Lorre
Saint Joan, directed by Otto Preminger, starring Jean Seberg – (GB/U.S.)
Sayonara, directed by Joshua Logan, starring Marlon Brando, James Garner, Red Buttons, Miyoshi Umeki
The Seventh Seal (Det sjunde inseglet), directed by Ingmar Bergman, starring Max von Sydow – (Sweden)
The Shiralee, starring Peter Finch – (GB)
Shoot-Out at Medicine Bend, starring Randolph Scott and Angie Dickinson
Silk Stockings, starring Fred Astaire and Cyd Charisse
The Singing Ringing Tree (Das singende, klingende Bäumchen) – (East Germany)
Slaughter on Tenth Avenue, starring Richard Egan and Walter Matthau (see also ballet Slaughter on Tenth Avenue)
Sleepless (la anam), starring Faten Hamama, Yehia Chehine and Omar Sharif – (Egypt)
The Smallest Show on Earth, directed by Basil Dearden, starring Bill Travers, Virginia McKenna, Peter Sellers – (GB)
The Snow Queen (Snezhnaya koroleva) an animated film – (USSR)
Something of Value, starring Rock Hudson and Sidney Poitier
The Spirit of St. Louis, starring James Stewart in a biopic of Charles Lindbergh
Spring Reunion, starring Betty Hutton and Dana Andrews
Stopover Tokyo, starring Robert Wagner and Joan Collins
The Story of Esther Costello, starring Joan Crawford, Rossano Brazzi, Heather Sears – (GB)
The Strange One, starring Ben Gazzara and George Peppard
The Strange World of Planet X (The Cosmic Monsters), starring Forrest Tucker – (Britain)
Sweet Smell of Success, directed by Alexander Mackendrick, written by Ernest Lehman, starring Burt Lancaster and Tony Curtis

T
The Tall T, directed by Budd Boetticher, starring Randolph Scott and Richard Boone
The Deadly Mantis, starring Craig Stevens and William Hopper
The Giant Claw, starring Jeff Morrow and Mara Corday
Tammy and the Bachelor, starring Debbie Reynolds and Leslie Nielsen
The Tattered Dress, starring Jeanne Crain, Jeff Chandler, Jack Carson
Ten Thousand Bedrooms, starring Dean Martin
The Three Faces of Eve, starring Joanne Woodward and Lee J. Cobb
Three Violent People, starring Charlton Heston, Anne Baxter, Forrest Tucker
Throne of Blood (Kumonosu-jō), directed by Akira Kurosawa, starring Toshiro Mifune – (Japan)
Time Limit, directed by Karl Malden, starring Richard Widmark, Richard Basehart, June Lockhart
The Tin Star, starring Anthony Perkins, Henry Fonda, Betsy Palmer
Tip on a Dead Jockey, starring Robert Taylor, Dorothy Malone, Jack Lord
Tizoc, starring Pedro Infante and María Félix – (Mexico)
Top Secret Affair, starring Kirk Douglas and Susan Hayward
The Tough (Al-Fetewa) – (Egypt)
Tumsa Nahin Dekha, starring Shammi Kapoor – (India)

U
The Undead
The Unholy Wife, starring Diana Dors and Rod Steiger	 
Untamed Youth, starring Mamie Van Doren
Until They Sail, starring Paul Newman, Piper Laurie, Jean Simmons

V
Valerie, directed by Gerd Oswald, starring Sterling Hayden, Anita Ekberg, Anthony Steel
El vampiro (The Vampire) – (Mexico)
Voodoo Island, starring Boris Karloff and Jean Engstrom

W
The Way to the Gold, starring Jeffrey Hunter and Sheree North
The Wayward Bus, starring Jayne Mansfield, Joan Collins, Dan Dailey
White Nights (Le Notti Bianche), directed by Luchino Visconti, starring Maria Schell and Marcello Mastroianni – (Italy)
Whom God Forgives (Amanecer en Puerta Oscura) – (Spain)
Wild Is the Wind, starring Anna Magnani and Anthony Quinn
Wild Strawberries (Smultronstället), directed by Ingmar Bergman, starring Bibi Andersson and Victor Sjöström – (Sweden)
Will Success Spoil Rock Hunter?, starring Jayne Mansfield (reprising her Broadway role) and Tony Randall
The Wings of Eagles, starring John Wayne and Maureen O'Hara (their 4th film together)
Witness for the Prosecution, directed by Billy Wilder, starring Tyrone Power, Marlene Dietrich, Charles Laughton
Woman in a Dressing Gown, directed by J. Lee Thompson – (GB)

Y
Yagyu Secret Scrolls (Yagyu Bugeicho), starring Toshiro Mifune – Japan
Yellow Crow (Kiiroi karasu) – (Japan)
Young and Dangerous, starring Mark Damon

Z
Zero Hour!, starring Dana Andrews, Sterling Hayden, Linda Darnell, Elroy "Crazylegs" Hirsch, dramatic basis for later spoof Airplane!

Short film series
Looney Tunes (1930–1969)
Terrytoons (1930–1964)
Merrie Melodies (1931–1969)
The Three Stooges (1934–1959)
Tom and Jerry (1940–1958)
Woody Woodpecker (1941–1972)
Droopy (1943–1958)
Noveltoons (1943–1967)
The Nearsighted Mister Magoo (1950–1959)
Casper the Friendly Ghost (1950–1959)
Herman and Katnip (1952–1959)
Chilly Willy (1953–1972)
Ending this year
Popeye the Sailor (1933-1957)
Maggie and Sam (1955-1957)
Spike and Tyke (1957)

Births

Deaths
January 14 – Humphrey Bogart, 57, American actor, Casablanca, The Maltese Falcon, Key Largo, The Caine Mutiny
January 19 – Sheila Terry, 46, American actress, The Sphinx, The Silk Express
January 26 – William Eythe, 38, American actor, The Song of Bernadette, The House on 92nd Street
February 19 – Märta Torén, 31, Swedish actress, Sirocco, One Way Street
March 25 – Max Ophüls, 54, German director, The Earrings of Madame de..., Lola Montès
March 31
Harry Depp, 74, American actor, The Love Girl, Inez from Hollywood
Gene Lockhart, 65, Canadian actor, Miracle on 34th Street, Algiers
April 3 – Ned Sparks, 73, Canadian actor, 42nd Street, Imitation of Life
April 8 – Dorothy Sebastian, 53, American actress, Spite Marriage, Our Dancing Daughters
April 27 – Paweł Owerłło, 87, Polish actor, Pan Tadeusz 
May 7 – Charles King, 62, American actor, Outlaws of the Plains, Adventures of Sir Galahad
May 9 – Ezio Pinza, 64, Italian singer and actor, Tonight We Sing, Mr. Imperium
May 12 – Erich von Stroheim, 71, Austrian actor, director, Sunset Boulevard, La Grande Illusion
May 29 – James Whale, 67, British director, Frankenstein, The Invisible Man
June 12 – Robert Alton, 51, American choreographer and director, White Christmas, Pagan Love Song
July 3 – Judy Tyler, 24, American actress, Jailhouse Rock, Bop Girl Goes Calypso
July 15 – George Cleveland, 71, Canadian actor, Carson City, Fort Defiance
July 24 – Sacha Guitry, 72, French playwright, actor and director, Confessions of a Cheat, A Crime in Paradise
August 7 – Oliver Hardy, 65, American actor, The Flying Deuces, Sons of the Desert
August 9 – Konrad Tom, 70, Polish actor, screenwriter, director and singer, His Excellency, The Shop Assistant
August 12 – Tim Whelan, 63, American director, The Thief of Bagdad, The Divorce of Lady X
September 1 – Helen Haye, 83, Indian-British actress, The 39 Steps, Richard III
September 19 – Edvard Persson, 69, Swedish actor, South of the Highway, Kalle's Inn
October 20 – Jack Buchanan, 66, British actor, Auld Lang Syne, The Band Wagon
October 29 – Louis B. Mayer, 73, Russian-American producer and studio executive, Greed, That's Entertainment!
November 17 – Cora Witherspoon, 67, American actress, The Bank Dick, Libeled Lady
November 29 – Erich Wolfgang Korngold, 60, Austrian composer, Anthony Adverse, The Adventures of Robin Hood
November 30 – Fred F. Sears, 44, American director, Earth vs. the Flying Saucers, Rock Around the Clock
December 11 – Musidora, 58, French actress, director, Les Vampires, Judex
December 15 – Alfonso Bedoya, 53, Mexican actor, The Treasure of the Sierra Madre, The Big Country
December 24 – Norma Talmadge, 63, American actress, New York Nights, Secrets 
December 25 – Charles Pathé, 94, French producer, writer, The Conquest of the Pole
December 27 – Alan Bridge, 66, American actor, The Stranger from Texas, Cross My Heart

Film debuts 
Norman Alden – Hear Me Good
Alan Arkin – Calypso Heat Wave
Bruno Cremer – Send a Woman When the Devil Fails
Alain Delon – Send a Woman When the Devil Fails
Catherine Deneuve – The Twilight Girls
Ben Gazzara – The Strange One
William Hickey – A Hatful of Rain
Bill Hunter – The Shiralee
Clifton James – The Strange One
Sally Kellerman – Reform School Girl
George Peppard – The Strange One
Lee Remick – A Face in the Crowd
Jean Seberg – Saint Joan
Liv Ullmann – Fjols til fjells
Ray Walston – Kiss Them for Me
Adam West – Voodoo Island

Notes

References 

 
Film by year